Venables-Vernon is a surname:
 George Venables-Vernon, 1st Baron Vernon (1709–1780), British politician 
 George Venables-Vernon, 2nd Baron Vernon (1735–1813), British politician
 George John Venables-Vernon, 5th Baron Vernon (1803–1866)

See also
Venables-Vernon-Harcourt
Vernon family
Venables

Compound surnames
Surnames of English origin
Surnames of Norman origin